Sheldon Benjamin Govier (born 11 January 1876 in Coatbridge, Scotland; died 1951 in Chicago, Illinois), also known as Ben Govier, was an American soccer center halfback who spent his entire career in the United States, primarily with Pullman F.C.  He is a member of the National Soccer Hall of Fame.

Youth
Govier was born in Scotland to English parents. They moved to Newton, Cambuslang when he was three and he played schoolboy football at Hallside Primary. His parents left Britain in 1891 and settled the family in Chicago, Illinois. His father died within months of their arrival in Chicago and Govier, fifteen years old at the time, went to work for the Pullman Company.  He eventually played for the company team, Pullman F.C.  His younger brother, Sheldon William, was eight when they arrived in Chicago. Sheldon W. later both worked and played for Pullman, but became better known for his involvement in Chicago politics. Biographies of the two men frequently intermix their biographical details.

Career
When Govier began playing for Pullman, it competed in the Chicago League of Association Football. He gained his first start with the team when he was fifteen. He then moved to Thistles. In December 1896, Govier moved to the St. Louis Cycling Club of the St. Louis Football Association. As late as 1900, Govier would play for Cycling Club if called upon. In 1901, Govier briefly played for Chicago in a four team league created by baseball owners. The league lasted a few games before collapsing. In 1905, he was captain of the Chicago All Star team which defeated the touring Pilgrim's team. He played one season each for Wanderers, Woodlawn and Buxton Red Sox before rejoining Pullman. In 1917, Pullman disbanded and Govier moved to Joliet F.C. before retiring in 1918. He was inducted into the National Soccer Hall of Fame in 1950. His son, Benjamin Govier, Jr., also played in the Chicago leagues.

References

External links
 Ben Govier: Captain Pullman Football Club, Spalding's Official "Soccer" Football Guide [1915-1916 season]
 
 1904-05 Cycling Club with Govier; see p. 32, Association Foot Ball Guide, [1904-1905 season], Spalding's Athletic Library, scan via CARLI Digital Collections

1876 births
1951 deaths
American soccer players
National Soccer Hall of Fame members
Soccer players from Chicago
Pullman F.C. players
Footballers from Coatbridge
Scottish emigrants to the United States
Association football central defenders
Sportspeople from Cambuslang
Footballers from South Lanarkshire
Scottish footballers
Scottish people of English descent
American people of English descent